"Save Me" is a song by British-American band Fleetwood Mac from their 15th studio album, Behind the Mask, released as a single in 1990. Written and sung by Christine McVie, it was the group's last top-40 hit in the United States, where it reached  33. "Save Me" achieved modest success in the United Kingdom, where it peaked at No. 53. It also reached the top 10 in Canada, Finland, and the Netherlands. The song was, as the slightly shorter single edit, included in the group's 2018 compilation 50 Years – Don't Stop.

Track listings
7-inch single
A. "Save Me"
B. "Another Woman" (live at Cow Palace, San Francisco)

German CD single
 "Save Me"
 "Another Woman" (live)
 "Everywhere" (live)

German maxi-single
 "Save Me" – 4:13
 "Another Woman" (live) – 3:48
 "The Second Time" – 2:31

Credits
 Christine McVie – keyboards, synthesizer, lead vocals
 Rick Vito – lead guitar, backing vocals
 Billy Burnette – rhythm guitar, backing vocals
 Stevie Nicks – backing vocals
 John McVie – bass guitar
 Mick Fleetwood – drums, gong, finger cymbals, shaker, wind chimes

Charts

Weekly charts

Year-end charts

References

1990 singles
1990 songs
Fleetwood Mac songs
Songs written by Christine McVie
Songs written by Eddy Quintela
Warner Records singles